Robert Thomason may refer to:

R. Ewing Thomason (1879–1973), politician
Robert Wayne Thomason (1952–1995), mathematician